The Cherrydale Historic District is a national historic district located in the Cherrydale neighborhood of Arlington County, Virginia. It contains 948 contributing buildings, 1 contributing site, 2 contributing structures, and 1 contributing object in a residential neighborhood in northern Arlington. The area was platted in 1898, with the majority of dwellings constructed in the second quarter of the 20th century. The dwelling styles include a variety of architectural styles, including a number of Colonial Revival and Queen Anne style dwellings. Also located in the district is the separately listed Cherrydale Volunteer Fire House.

It was listed on the National Register of Historic Places in 2003.

References

Houses on the National Register of Historic Places in Virginia
Queen Anne architecture in Virginia
Colonial Revival architecture in Virginia
Historic districts in Arlington County, Virginia
National Register of Historic Places in Arlington County, Virginia
Houses in Arlington County, Virginia
Historic districts on the National Register of Historic Places in Virginia